Devon Petersen (born 4 June 1986) is a South African professional darts player and a pundit for Sky Sports. He has qualified for the PDC World Championship on seven occasions with his best result coming in 2014, 2019 and 2021 when he reached the last 16. Petersen has become popular for dancing on to the stage to Shakira's "Waka Waka (This Time for Africa)" before his matches.

Career
He qualified for the 2011 PDC World Darts Championship as the South African champion. He beat Guyana's Norman Madhoo 4–3 in the preliminary round with big checkouts including a 136 and a 146. In beating Madhoo, he earned a place in the first round proper, where he would play Jamie Caven. Despite winning the first set, Petersen lost by 3 sets to 1.

He qualified for the 2011 PDC Pro Tour as one of four semi-finalists from the second day of the Pro Tour's Q School. Since turning professional, Petersen has left South Africa to live in Brighouse, West Yorkshire, and signed a sponsorship deal with leading darts manufacturer Unicorn.

Petersen retained the South African Open in 2011 to qualify for the 2012 PDC World Darts Championship, where he edged out José Oliveira de Sousa 4–3 (legs) in the preliminary round to reach the last 64 for the second successive year. Petersen played Steve Brown in the first round and recovered from 2–1 down in sets to win 3–2, also recovering from 2–0 down in legs in the deciding set and surviving one match dart. Petersen said after the win that it was a "dream come true" and that he was sure he had more in him. He played Gary Anderson in the second round and played the best he has in front of the television cameras. However, the class of his opponent came through and he lost 4–2, with Anderson stating after the match that "Devon became very tough for me". Petersen himself said that he would "work hard and come back a better player".

He represented South Africa with Shawn Hogan in the 2012 PDC World Cup of Darts and together they defeated Spain 5–2 in the first round before causing a shock by knocking out number 4 seeds Scotland in the second round in a sudden death leg. They played Wales in the quarter finals and were beaten in the deciding doubles match. Petersen prematurely celebrated as he thought he had taken his country to the semi-finals by hitting double 16. However, he had miscounted and they were out of the tournament moments later when Richie Burnett secured the winning double. Petersen reached the last 64 of the 2012 UK Open by defeating Andrew Gilding 4–0, but then lost to Ronnie Baxter 9–6. In June, he qualified for the European Tour Event 3 after defeating Darren Webster and Gareth Cousins in the UK qualifier. Petersen again lost to Baxter this time 6–2 in the first round in Düsseldorf.

Petersen took a year away from darts in 2013 to recuperate from an arm injury. In September he won the South African Masters by defeating Graham Filby 9–3 in the final and in doing so earned a place in his third World Championship for the 2014 edition, where he saw off Mohd Latif Sapup 4–1 in the preliminary round. Petersen danced onto the stage for his first round match against Steve Beaton which immediately got the crowd on his side as he defeated the 1996 BDO world champion 3–1 in sets. Petersen was 2–1 ahead against Justin Pipe in the next round and in the deciding leg of the fourth set he took out a crucial 130 finish with Pipe on 36, before wrapping up a 4–1 win. In the third round his run came to an end when he lost 4–0 to James Wade. Petersen partnered Filby in the World Cup of Darts and they came past Germany 5–3 in the first round, before Petersen beat Paul Lim 4–0 in his singles match in the second round. Filby lost his to Harith Lim, meaning a doubles match was needed to settle the tie which South Africa edged 4–3. In the quarter-finals they faced the number one seeds of Phil Taylor and Adrian Lewis, with Petersen and Filby both losing their singles matches to exit the tournament. Petersen was defeated in the final of the South African Qualifier for the 2015 World Championship 9–5 by Nolan Arendse.

In January 2015, Petersen played in Q School and earned a two-year tour card on the second day by defeating Chris Hartrey 5–1 in the final round. Petersen did not base himself in Britain for 2015 and estimated he would make 20 trips back and forth from South Africa during the year. He entered the UK Open in the second round stage and beat Mark Cox 5–4, Mark Barilli 9–8, Jamie Caven 9–6 and Eddie Dootson 9–3 to reach the quarter-finals of a major PDC event for the first time. Petersen led world number one Michael van Gerwen 3–2 at the first break but had had darts to win every leg and went on to lose 10–5. He became the first South African to throw a nine-dart finish on the PDC tour at the sixth Players Championship and went on to reach the quarter-finals where Van Gerwen whitewashed him 6–0. At the World Cup, Petersen and Filby survived a match dart from Finland to win 5–4 before losing both of their singles matches against Van Gerwen and Raymond van Barneveld of the Netherlands in the second round. Petersen was invited to participate in the first World Series of Darts Finals, where he was eliminated 6–3 by Robert Thornton in the first round.

Petersen saw off Ricky Evans 6–5 and Kim Huybrechts 6–2 at the 2016 Dutch Darts Masters and then lost 6–2 to Mervyn King in the third round. He qualified for six other European Tour events and, even though he didn't reach the third round again, he had done enough to make his debut in the European Championship, but was defeated 6–4 by King in the opening round. Petersen and Graham Filby missed 14 darts at doubles as they were beaten 5–1 by Singapore in the first round of the World Cup. Petersen lost in the first round of the European Championship (6–4 to Mervyn King) and the Players Championship Finals (6–3 to Robbie Green).

Petersen struggled in the first round of the 2017 World Championship as he could only average 79.29 in a 3–1 defeat to Steve Beaton.

Petersen returned to form in the 2019 World Championship reaching the Last 16 his best run since 2014 beating Wayne Jones, Ian White, and Steve West before narrowly losing to Nathan Aspinall.

Again he qualified via the PDC World Africa Qualifying Event for the 2020 World Championship. He played Luke Humphries in the first round and lost 1–3. Petersen remained in the top 64 of the PDC Order of Merit and kept his tour card for 2020.

On 22 February 2020, Petersen reached his first ever PDC semi-final, at Players Championship 5, beating high quality players such as Stephen Bunting and Rob Cross (the World Number Four at the time) along the way, before losing to eventual winner Peter Wright 7–5.

On 27 September 2020, Petersen won his first ranking title beating Johnny Clayton 8–3 at the German Darts Championship. He followed this by a Second Round loss to Gerwyn Price in the 2020 European Darts Grand Prix, hence finished 4th with £27,000 on the European Tour order of merit, which cemented his place as a top seed in the 2020 PDc European Championship. In this tournament, Petersen eliminated Andy Hamilton, Martin Kleermaker and Ian White to reach his first major televised Semi Final, but lost narrowly 10–11 to James Wade. This run equaled a cheque of £32,000.

Further televised exposure followed in the 2020 PDC World Cup of Darts, where he was partnered by Carl Gabriel in a 5-1 First Round humiliation to Poland with Krzysztof Ratajski & Krzysztof Kciuk.

Despite some inconsistency in form at the 2020 PDC Winter Series, Petersen showed rejuvenation in the 2020 PDC Grand Slam of Darts, where he reached the Last 16 on his debut. In the course of doing so, he won all three of his group stage games against Ian White, Dirk van Duijvenbode and Peter Wright, topping the group and receiving the group winner's bonus of £3,500. Australian rising star Damon Heta proved too big of an obstacle and denied Petersen a place in his third major televised Quarter Final in a 10–7 victory over the South African.

Petersen entered the Top 32 in the world before the commencement of the 2020 PDC Players Championship Finals, but lost 3–6 to Luke Humphries, averaging 101.46 against Humphries' 99.65.

Petersen returned to the Alexandra Palace in London for the 2021 PDC World Darts Championship and started as a seeded player in Round 2 (Last 64) for the first time in his career.  He overcame Steve Lennon and Jason Lowe to reach the fourth round, where he lost 4–0 to Gary Anderson

Darts used
Petersen previously used darts given to him by Phil Taylor at the 2009 South African Masters.

World Championship results

PDC

 2011: First round (lost to Jamie Caven 1–3)
 2012: Second round (lost to Gary Anderson 2–4)
 2014: Third round (lost to James Wade 0–4)
 2017: First round (lost to Steve Beaton 1–3)
 2018: First round (lost to Darren Webster 2–3)
 2019: Fourth round (lost to Nathan Aspinall 3–4)
 2020: First round (lost to Luke Humphries 1–3)
 2021: Fourth round (lost to Gary Anderson 0–4)
 2022: Second round (lost to Raymond Smith 0–3)

Performance timeline
BDO

PDC

 

PDC European Tour

References

External links

1986 births
Living people
South African darts players
Sportspeople from Cape Town
Cape Coloureds
Professional Darts Corporation current tour card holders
PDC ranking title winners
PDC World Cup of Darts South African team